Fufu is a dough-like food found in West African and Caribbean cuisines.

Fufu may also refer to:

Fufu (album), a 1999 album by BANTU
Fufu (dog) (1997–2015), a pet dog of Vajiralongkorn
Fufu (Tanzanian ward), an administrative ward in Tanzania